Androsaemum is one of 36 sections in the genus Hypericum. It contains 4 species and 1 nothospecies and its type species is H. androsaemum.

References

Androsaemum
Androsaemum